San Pedro Teutila is a town and municipality in Oaxaca in south-western Mexico. The municipality covers an area of 148 km².
It is part of Cuicatlán District in the south of the Cañada Region.

As of 2010, the municipality had a total population of 4277.

References

Municipalities of Oaxaca